NA-236 Karachi East-I is a constituency for the National Assembly of Pakistan. After the 2018 delimitations, Gulshan-e-Iqbal part of the former NA-253 is now in NA-243 (Karachi East-II).

Members of Parliament

2018-2023: NA-242 Karachi East-I

Election 2002 

General elections were held on 10 Oct 2002. Asad Ullah Bhutto of Muttahida Majlis-e-Amal won by 28,840 votes.

Election 2008 

General elections were held on 18 Feb 2008. Syed Haider Abbas Rizvi of Muttahida Qaumi Movement won by 96,973 votes.

Election 2013 

General elections were held on 11 May 2013. Muhammad Muzammil Qureshi of Muttahida Qaumi Movement won by 101,386 votes and became the member of National Assembly.

Election 2018

By-election 2023 
A by-election will be held on 16 March 2023 due to the resignation of Saifur Rehman Khan, the previous MNA from this seat.

See also
NA-235 Karachi Korangi-III
NA-237 Karachi East-II

References

External links 
Election result's official website

NA-253
Karachi